The city of Petaluma, California was the home to minor league baseball teams in the late 19th and early 20th centuries. The first team, known as the Petaluma Poison Oaks played in the California Players' League in 1894. A second team played in the California State League in 1903. The third and final team was the Petaluma Incubators who played in the Central California League in 1910. This team moved to Elmhurst, California during the 1910 season and was renamed as the Elmhurst Incubators and then in 1911 became the Elmhurst Tildens. The team moved again, during the 1911 season to Oakland Carroll, California as the Oakland Carroll Emery Arms. They shut down at that point and no further teams have played in any of these cities.

External links
 Petaluma Baseball Reference
 Elmhurst Baseball Reference
 Oakland Carroll Baseball Reference

Defunct Central California League teams
Defunct California Players League teams
Defunct California State League teams
Professional baseball teams in California
1894 establishments in California
1911 disestablishments in California
Baseball teams established in 1894
Baseball teams disestablished in 1911
Petaluma, California
Defunct baseball teams in California